German submarine U-290 was a Type VIIC U-boat of Nazi Germany's Kriegsmarine during World War II.

The submarine was laid down on 12 October 1942 at the Bremer Vulkan yard at Bremen-Vegesack as yard number 55. She was launched on 16 June 1943 and commissioned on 24 July under the command of Oberleutnant zur See Hartmut Strenger.

She did not sink or damage any ships.

She was scuttled in Flensburg Fjord on 5 May 1945.

Design
German Type VIIC submarines were preceded by the shorter Type VIIB submarines. U-290 had a displacement of  when at the surface and  while submerged. She had two shafts and two  propellers.

U-290 was fitted with five  torpedo tubes (four fitted at the bow and one at the stern), fourteen torpedoes, one  SK C/35 naval gun, (220 rounds), one  Flak M42 and two twin  C/30 anti-aircraft guns. The boat had a complement of between forty-four and sixty.

Service history
U-290 served with the 8th U-boat Flotilla for training from July 1943 to April 1944 and operationally with the 6th flotilla from 1 May. She was reassigned to the 11th flotilla in August. She was transferred twice more, first back to the 8th flotilla in late August, then the 4th flotilla in mid-February 1945.

First patrol
The boat's initial foray, which was preceded by a short voyage from Kiel to Egersund (southeast of Stavanger) in Norway, began with her departure from the Nordic port on 1 June 1944 and finished at Bergen on 16 June.

She had been attacked by a Norwegian De Havilland Mosquito of No. 333 Squadron RAF on 14 June. Eight of her crew were wounded.

A series of brief journeys then followed, between Bergen, Kristiansand, Kiel and Gotenhafen (now Gdynia, Poland).

Second patrol
She departed Gotenhafen on 7 September 1944. After patrolling the Baltic, she docked at Danzig (now Gdańsk, Poland) on 5 November.

Third patrol and fate
After sailing to Libau in western Latvia, she departed from there on 1 January 1945, arriving in Kiel on the 29th.

She was scuttled in Kupfermühle Bay, part of Flensburg Fjord, on 5 May 1945.

References

Bibliography

External links

German Type VIIC submarines
U-boats commissioned in 1943
World War II submarines of Germany
1943 ships
Ships built in Bremen (state)
Operation Regenbogen (U-boat)
Maritime incidents in May 1945